"My First Love" is a 1989 song by American recording band Atlantic Starr and is from the band's eighth album We're Movin' Up. The single was their second number one on the Billboard's Black Singles chart, in which lead vocals were performed by Porscha Martin and Wayne Lewis. "My First Love" peaked at number one for one week, but it failed to chart on the Hot 100.

Chart

References

1989 singles
Atlantic Starr songs
Contemporary R&B ballads
Pop ballads
Soul ballads
1989 songs
Warner Records singles
1980s ballads